Makinami  was a  of the Imperial Japanese Navy. Her name means "Overflowing Waves" (Rolling Wave).

Design and description
The Yūgumo class was a repeat of the preceding  with minor improvements that increased their anti-aircraft capabilities. Their crew numbered 228 officers and enlisted men. The ships had two Kampon geared steam turbines, each driving one propeller shaft, using steam provided by three Kampon water-tube boilers.

The main armament of the Yūgumo class consisted of six Type 3  guns in three twin-gun turrets, one superfiring pair aft and one turret forward of the superstructure. The guns were able to elevate up to 75° to increase their ability against aircraft, but their slow rate of fire, slow traversing speed, and the lack of any sort of high-angle fire-control system meant that they were virtually useless as anti-aircraft guns. They were built with four Type 96  anti-aircraft guns in two twin-gun mounts, but more of these guns were added over the course of the war. The ships were also armed with eight  torpedo tubes in a two quadruple traversing mounts; one reload was carried for each tube. Their anti-submarine weapons comprised two depth charge throwers for which 36 depth charges were carried.

Construction and career
On the night of 24–25 November 1943, Makinami was on a troop evacuation run to Buka Island when she was sunk in the Battle of Cape St. George.

Notes

References

External links
 CombinedFleet.com: Yūgumo-class destroyers
 CombinedFleet.com: Makinami history

Yūgumo-class destroyers
World War II destroyers of Japan
Shipwrecks in the Solomon Sea
1941 ships
Maritime incidents in November 1943
Ships built by Maizuru Naval Arsenal